The 2011 Chick-fil-A Bowl was a college football bowl game held on December 31, 2011, at the Georgia Dome in Atlanta, Georgia, as part of the 2011–12 NCAA Bowl season. With sponsorship from Chick-fil-A, it was the 44th edition of the game known throughout most of its history as the Peach Bowl.

The game, which was telecast starting at 7:30 p.m. ET on ESPN and ESPN 3D, featured the Virginia Cavaliers from the Atlantic Coast Conference versus the Auburn Tigers from the Southeastern Conference. Auburn's running back Michael Dyer was suspended for this game, which was also Auburn offensive coordinator Gus Malzahn's last game as he would be taking a job as the head coach at Arkansas State.

The game started when Virginia scored two straight touchdowns from Michael Rocco throwing both of them to wide receiver Kris Burd. As Auburn got the ball on their second possession, Auburn starter Clint Moseley went out on an ankle injury. Virginia went three and out. Then Auburn got some life after Garrett Harper blocked Virginia's first punt of the day.

Auburn took total control of the game as they scored on their next five possessions. Virginia scored ten more points after the blocked punt. The final score was 43–24 as Auburn won three straight bowl games. Auburn's dual-threat running back Onterio McCalebb had 109 yards rushing, 1 rushing TD, and 1 receiving TD. Auburn's freshman quarterback Kiehl Frazier ran for 3 touchdowns. Jake Holland had an interception. Cornerback Chris Davis had some blocks and tackles, including on a fourth-down trick play. Former starter Barrett Trotter returned with a TD, 175 yards and an average of 9.7 yards per play to end the 2011 season.

Auburn's Chris Davis won the Defensive MVP, and Onterio McCalebb won the Offensive MVP.

References

2011–12 NCAA football bowl games
2011
2011
2011
December 2011 sports events in the United States
2011 in sports in Georgia (U.S. state)
2011 in Atlanta